Elisa "Olga" Tingcungco Kho is a Filipino politician and medical doctor who is currently serving in the House of Representatives of the Philippines as the Representative of Masbate's 2nd congressional district since 2013. She previously served as the first female governor of Masbate. She is the wife of current Governor Antonio Kho.

References

External links
Results of 2007 Local Elections 
Philippines Local Leaders

Year of birth missing (living people)
Living people
Members of the House of Representatives of the Philippines from Masbate
Governors of Masbate
Women members of the House of Representatives of the Philippines
Lakas–CMD (1991) politicians
Lakas–CMD politicians
PDP–Laban politicians
Women provincial governors of the Philippines